Cerro Grande (Spanish for "big hill") may refer to:

Mountains 
 Cerro Grande (New Mexico), a summit near Los Alamos, New Mexico that was the starting point of a massive forest fire in May 2000
 Cerro Grande (Chihuahua), a prominent mountain overlooking Chihuahua City
 Cerro Grande (San Luis Potosí), a mountain in San Luis Potosí
 Cerro Ciénaga Grande, a mountain in the Salta Province of Argentina
 Cerro Grande (La Serena), a mountain in the Coquimbo Region of Chile
 Cerro Grande, a mountain in Patagonia

Other places 
 Cerro Grande, Rio Grande do Sul, a municipality in Mesoregion Noroeste Rio-Grandense, Rio Grande do Sul, Brazil
 Cerro Grande do Sul, a municipality in Mesoregion Metropolitana de Porto Alegre. Rio Grande do Sul, Brazil